Richard Roland Sherlock (born 15 September 1983) is a New Zealand former professional cricketer who played for the Canterbury cricket team. He played for the New Zealand "A" team in 2004 and 2005, but his career suffered a setback when he was injured in the build-up to the 2005-06 New Zealand cricket season. In 2010 Sherlock played with Horsham in the Sussex cricket competition. He was born in Palmerston North.

External links
 
 Interview by www.world-a-team.com with Richard Sherlock
 

1983 births
Living people
Cricketers from Palmerston North
New Zealand cricketers
Auckland cricketers
Canterbury cricketers
Central Districts cricketers